Walnut Bread is a 1977 Lithuanian drama film (made in Soviet times) directed by Arūnas Žebriūnas.

Production
Filmed in Sovcolor on 35 mm film in a 2.35:1 ratio.

Plot
In rural postwar Lithuania, the Šatas and Kaminskaitė families live next door to each other. A cow sold to the Šatas dies, creating enmity between the families. Andrius Šatas and Liuka Kaminskaitė grow up together and fall in love.

Cast 
 Algirdas Latėnas – Andrius Šatas
 Saulius Sipaitis – Antanas, Andrius father
  – Elytė, Andrius mother
 Leonid Obolensky – Andrius's grandfather
 Stasys Jonynas – young Andrius
  – Liuka Kaminskaitė
 Antanas Šurna – Liuka's aunt
  – Liuka's mom

References

External links 

1977 drama films
1977 films
Soviet drama films
Soviet-era Lithuanian films
Lithuanian drama films
Films set in Lithuania
Films set in 1953
Lithuanian-language films
Soviet teen films